Melaleuca comboynensis, commonly known as cliff bottlebrush, is a plant in the myrtle family, Myrtaceae and is endemic to New South Wales and Queensland in Australia. (Some Australian state herbaria continue to use the name Callistemon comboynensis.) It is usually a shrub, similar to Melaleuca citrina with its hard leaves, spikes of red flowers and clusters of cup-shaped fruits but differs in that its leaves are generally wider and its habitat is usually rocky outcrops rather than along watercourses.

Description

The flowers are arranged in spikes usually near the end of the branches. There are 31 to 41 stamens in each flower, with their "stalks" (the filaments) red to crimson and "tips" (the anthers) a dark purple.

Taxonomy and naming
Melaleuca comboynensis was first named in 2006 by Lyndley Craven in Novon. It was first formally described in 1943 as Callistemon comboynensis by Edwin Cheel in Proceedings of the Linnean Society of New South Wales. His specimen was collected in the "Comboyne Ranges in crevices of rocks". The specific epithet (comboynensis) refers to the location where the type specimen was found.

Callistemon comboynensis is regarded as a synonym of Melaleuca comboynensis by the Royal Botanic Gardens, Kew.

Distribution and habitat
This melaleuca occurs in the high country in and between the Border Ranges in southern Queensland and the Gibraltar Range in northern New South Wales. It also occurs in the lower Murray River districts of north-western Victoria and south-eastern South Australia. It mostly grows on rocky hilltops and crevices above .

Use in horticulture
Melaleuca comboynensis is well known in cultivation as an attractive and hardy shrub for temperate areas.

References

comboynensis
Flora of New South Wales
Flora of Queensland
Plants described in 1943
Taxa named by Edwin Cheel